The 2015 Iranian Futsal 2nd Division will be divided into three phases.

The league will also be composed of 28 teams divided into four divisions. All divisions of 7 teams, whose teams will be divided geographically. Teams will play only other teams in their own division, once at home and once away for a total of 12 matches each.

Teams

Group North-East

Group  North-West

Group South-East

Group South-West

Number of teams by region

Standings

North-East

North-West

South-East

South-West

Play Off 

Winner qualifies for the main round.

First leg

Return leg

Main round

See also 
 2014–15 Iranian Futsal Super League
 2014–15 Futsal 1st Division
 2014–15 Persian Gulf Cup
 2014–15 Azadegan League
 2014–15 Iran Football's 2nd Division
 2014–15 Iran Football's 3rd Division
 2014–15 Hazfi Cup

References 

Iran Futsal's 2nd Division seasons
3
3